Jesús Martín Álvarez Hurtado (born 26 August 1981) is a retired Peruvian footballer who played in the centre back position.

Club career 
Álvarez made his debut in the Torneo Descentralizado in the 2005 Descentralizado season with local club Coronel Bolognesi FC. He scored his first goal in the Descentralizado the following season with Bolognesi in Round 1 of the 2006 season in his club's 1–3 away win over Alianza Atlético, with Álvarez scoring the winning goal in the 9th minute.

In January 2007 Álvarez joined Peruvian giants Sporting Cristal. He made his Descentralizado league debut for Cristal on 14 February 2007 in Round 3 (Apertura) away to Sport Boys. Manager Jorge Sampaoli put him in the match for Carlos Lobaton in the 46th minute to secure the 0–1 win for Cristal.

International career
On 17 May 2012 it was announced that Álvarez was included in Sergio Markarian's squad list for the upcoming friendly match against Nigeria.

Coaching career
In June 2018, he was appointed as manager of Sport Loreto. He left the club on 24 September 2018. On 3 November 2018, he was then appointed as manager of Sport Boys. He was fired on 10 March 2019.

Honours

Club
Juan Aurich 
 Torneo Descentralizado: 2011

Sporting Cristal
Torneo Descentralizado: 2012

References 

1981 births
Living people
People from Tacna
Association football central defenders
Peruvian footballers
Coronel Bolognesi footballers
Sporting Cristal footballers
Juan Aurich footballers
Club Deportivo Universidad de San Martín de Porres players
Club Deportivo Universidad César Vallejo footballers
Peruvian Primera División players